Shanta is a given name. Notable people with the name include:

 Shanta Apte (1916-1964), Indian singer and actress
 Shanta Gandhi (1917-2002), Indian theatre director
 Shanta Gokhale (born 1939), Indian writer
 Shanta Kumar (born 1934), Indian politician
 Shanta Pathak (1927–2010), British businesswoman
 Shanta Rao (1930-2007), Indian dancer
 Shanta Shelke (1922-2002), Indian poet